Biluochun or Bi Luo Chun (pronounced ) is a famous green tea originally grown in the Dongting mountain region near Lake Tai in Suzhou, Jiangsu, China.  Also known as Pi Lo Chun, it is renowned for its delicate appearance, fruity taste, floral aroma, showy white hairs and early cropping.

The name Biluochun literally means "green snail spring".  It is called so because it is a green tea that is rolled into a tight spiral, resembling snail meat, and is cropped in early spring.

Its original name is Xia Sha Ren Xiang ("scary fragrance"). Legend tells of its discovery by a tea picker who ran out of space in her basket and put the tea between her breasts instead. The tea, warmed by her body heat, emitted a strong aroma that surprised the girl.

According to the Qing Dynasty chronicle Ye Shi Da Guan, the Kangxi Emperor visited Lake Tai in the 38th year of his rule.  At that time, because of its rich aroma, local people called it "Scary Fragrance". The Kangxi Emperor decided to give it a more elegant name, "Green Snail Spring".

Chinese tea experts regard it very highly.  Zhen Jun (1857 to 1918), author of tea encyclopedia Cha Shuo, ranked it first among Chinese green tea. Longjing tea came second, Liu An Gua Pian came third.  It is so delicate and tender that one kilogram of Dong Ting Bi Luo Chun consists of 14,000 to 15,000 tea shoots.

Today, Biluochun is cultivated in Dongting Mountains near Lake Tai in Suzhou, Jiangsu. Biluochun from Dong Shan (East Mountain) or Xi Shan (West Mountain) is considered the best. Biluochun is also grown in Zhejiang and Sichuan province. Their leaves are larger and less uniform (may contain yellow leaves). They taste more nutty than fruity and smooth.  Lastly, Biluochun is grown on the island of Taiwan, specifically at Sanxia District, New Taipei City.

Biluochun is divided into seven grades in decreasing order of quality: Supreme, Supreme I, Grade I, Grade II, Grade III, Chao Qing I, and Chao Qing II.

See also 
 List of Chinese teas

References

Chinese teas
Chinese tea grown in Jiangsu
Green tea